The Charles B. Reynolds Round Barn was a historic building located near Doon in rural Lyon County, Iowa, United States. It was built in the summer of 1904. In the early 1920s, the original conical roof was damaged due to a windstorm and replaced with a gambrel roof. The building was a true round barn and featured white horizontal siding, a two-pitch sectional roof and an octagon louvered cupola. The barn has been listed on the National Register of Historic Places since 1999. The barn was razed in September 2009.

References

National Register of Historic Places in Lyon County, Iowa
Barns on the National Register of Historic Places in Iowa
Buildings and structures completed in 1924
Buildings and structures in Lyon County, Iowa
Round barns in Iowa
Demolished buildings and structures in Iowa
Buildings and structures demolished in 2009